Jeļena Ostapenko defeated Veronika Kudermetova in the final, 6–0, 6–4 to win the women's singles tennis title at the 2022 Dubai Tennis Championships. She saved a match point en route to the title, in the quarterfinals against Petra Kvitová.

Garbiñe Muguruza was the defending champion, but lost in the second round to Kudermetova.

Seeds

Draw

Finals

Top half

Bottom half

Qualifying

Seeds

Qualifiers

Lucky losers

Qualifying draw

First qualifier

Second qualifier

Third qualifier

Fourth qualifier

Fifth qualifier

Sixth qualifier

References

External links
Main draw
Qualifying draw

2022 WTA Tour
Singles women